Trent was launched at Hull in 1790. Her master was J.Maw, her owner was Hammond, and her trade was Hull–Petersburg. Trent was lost on Hogland, Russia as she was sailing from London to Saint Petersburg, Russia. Her entry in Lloyd's Register carried the annotation "Lost".

Citations

1790 ships
Ships built in Kingston upon Hull
Merchant ships of England
Maritime incidents in 1791